Matusiak is a Polish surname. Notable people with the surname include:

 Bogumiła Matusiak (born 1971), Polish cyclist
 Łukasz Matusiak (born 1985), Polish footballer
 Radosław Matusiak (born 1982), Polish footballer
 Wojciech Matusiak (born 1945), Polish cyclist

Polish-language surnames